The Woman in the Trunk (German: Die Dame im Koffer) is a 1921 German silent mystery film directed by Emil Albes and starring Georg H. Schnell, Margit Barnay and Paul Bildt. It features a British detective Joe Jenkins, and was part of a trend of films inspired by Sherlock Holmes including the Joe Deebs and Stuart Webbs series.

Cast
 Georg H. Schnell as Joe Jenkins, Detektiv
 Margit Barnay	
 Paul Bildt 		
 Gerda Frey		
 Fred Goebel
 Gert Sascha

References

Bibliography
 Giesen, Rolf. The Nosferatu Story: The Seminal Horror Film, Its Predecessors and Its Enduring Legacy. McFarland, 2019.

External links

1921 films
Films of the Weimar Republic
German silent feature films
German mystery films
Films directed by Emil Albes
1921 mystery films
German black-and-white films
1920s German films